Theudebald or Theodebald (in modern English, Theobald; in French, Thibaut or Théodebald; in German, Theudowald) (c. 535–555), son of Theudebert I and Deuteria, was the king of Metz, Rheims, or Austrasia—as it is variously called—from 547 or 548 to 555.

He was only thirteen years of age when he succeeded and of ill health.  However, the loyalty of the nobility to his father's memory preserved the peace during his minority.  He married Waldrada, daughter of the Lombard king Wacho and his step-aunt (a sister of his father's second wife). This marriage fortified the alliance between Austrasia and Lombardy.

Nevertheless, Theudebald could not hold on to the conquests of his father in the north of Italia.  The Byzantine Emperor Justinian I sent an army under the command of Narses in 552. The Franks who did not perish of want or plague in Apulia were defeated at Casilinum.

In 550, Theudebald convoked the Council of Toul.

After a prolonged sickness and prostration, he died in 555.  His realm passed finally outside of the family of Theuderic I and was united to the kingdoms of his  granduncle Clotaire I, who would soon become king of all the Franks.

References

Frankish warriors
Merovingian kings
535 births
555 deaths
Ancient child monarchs
6th-century Frankish kings